ETAP Yachting is a Belgian boat builder based in Lokeren. The company specializes in the design and manufacture of fibreglass sailboats.

History
The company was founded by Norbert Joris in 1970 and was originally a manufacturer of lighting, aluminium and fibreglass products. ETAP stands for Electro Technical Apparatus.

The first sailboat design produced was the ETAP 22 in 1974, followed by the ETAP 20 in 1975.

The designs have been noted for their use of fibreglass foam sandwich construction, which provides buoyancy, making them unsinkable, while providing rigidity, sound dampening and protection from condensation. The boats also received praise for their high quality of construction and value retention.

In the Great Recession the company was losing money and was purchased by Dehler Yachts in 2008. Dehler Deutschland then declared bankruptcy later in 2008 and in January 2009 ETAP was declared insolvent. The company brand and moulds were purchased by MIC Industries in March 2009 and up until at least 2012 no boats were produced. It was reported that the company had ceased operations in 2012, but in 2021 the company was advertising seven designs, the ETAP 22s, ETAP 26s, ETAP 30cq, ETAP 32s, ETAP 37s, ETAP 48Ds sailboats and the ETAP 1100 AC powerboat.

Boats 

Summary of boats built by ETAP Yachting:

ETAP 22 - 1974
ETAP 20 - 1975
ETAP 28 - 1978
ETAP 23 - 1982
ETAP 23i - 1982
ETAP 26 - 1982
ETAP 22i - 1983
ETAP 30 - 1985
ETAP 28i - 1988
ETAP 38i - 1989
ETAP 32i - 1992
ETAP 35i - 1992
ETAP 23il - 1994
ETAP 26i - 1994
ETAP 30i - 1995
ETAP 21i - 1997
ETAP 34s - 1997
ETAP 39s - 1998
ETAP 24i - 1999
ETAP 32s - 2003
ETAP 37s - 2004
ETAP 26s - 2005
ETAP 28s - 2007
ETAP 22s - 2009
ETAP 48Ds - 2009
ETAP 30cq - 2010

See also
List of sailboat designers and manufacturers

References

External links

ETAP Yachting